Marcia Louise Snyder (sometimes spelled "Snider") was a comic book artist and newspaper cartoonist who worked for the Binder Studio, Timely Comics, Fawcett Comics, and Fiction House during the Golden Age of Comic Books.

Biography
Snyder was born in Kalamazoo, Michigan on May 13, 1907. She graduated from Western Normal High School in 1925.

Around the time she started working for Timely, she lived in Greenwich Village with her girlfriend, Mickey. At Fiction House, a publisher known for its female adventure heroes, she worked on such titles as "Camilla," a jungle girl feature in Jungle Comics.

In the late '70s, she "assisted" on the police comic Kerry Drake. What exactly that role entailed is unclear, though it is known that the original and credited creator was relying on ghostwriters and artists at that point.

Snyder is rumored to have married later in life.

She died on February 27, 1976, in Fort Lauderdale, Florida.

References

External links 
Marcia Snyder entry, Who's Who of American Comic Books, 1928–1999

1907 births
1976 deaths
20th-century American women artists
American female comics artists
Golden Age comics creators
LGBT comics creators
People from Kalamazoo, Michigan 
Artists from Michigan